The Naval Aircraft Factory N2N was an American two-seat open-cockpit primary training biplane designed and built by the Naval Aircraft Factory. The N2N could be fitted with twin-floats and was powered by a 200 hp Lawrance J-1 radial engine, only three N2N-1s were built.

Variants
N2N-1
Three-built later re-designated XN2N-1.
XN2N-1
The three N2N-1s re-designated.

Specifications

See also

References

Notes

Bibliography

 

N02N
1920s United States military trainer aircraft
Single-engined tractor aircraft
Biplanes
Floatplanes